The surname Günther, Gunther, Günter, Gunter, or Guenther may refer to:

In arts and entertainment
 Agnes Günther (1863–1911), German writer
 Gertrud Günther (1881–1944), German writer
 Johann Christian Günther (1695–1723), German poet
 John Gunther (1901–1970), American journalist and author
 Jyllian Gunther, American film director
 Kyle Gunther, lead vocalist for Michigan heavy metal band Battlecross
 Lee Gunther (1935–1998), American film editor
 Mike Gunther (born 1972), American film director and stuntman
 Sherry Gunther, American television producer
 Ursula Günther (1927–2006), German musicologist

In government and politics
 Christian Günther  (1886–1966), Swedish Foreign Minister
 Claës Günther (1799–1861), Swedish Prime Minister for Justice
 Daniel Günther (born 1973), German politician
 George Gunther (1919–2012), American politician
 Joachim Günther (born 1948), German politician

In science and academics
 Albert Günther (1830–1914), British zoologist
 Christine Guenther, American mathematician
 Edmund Gunter, (1581–1626), English clergyman, mathematician, geometer and astronomer
 Gotthard Günther (1900–1984), German philosopher
 Hans F. K. Günther (1891–1968), Nazi racial theorist
 Herbert V. Günther (1917–2006), teacher, writer and scholar
 Neil J. Gunther (born 1950), Australian-American scientist
 Robert Gunther (1869–1940), British science historian
 Siegmund Günther (1848–1923), German geographer and mathematician

In sport
 Christian Günter (born 1993), German football player
 Dave Gunther (born 1937), American basketball coach
 Dylan Guenther (born 2003), Canadian ice hockey player
 Jeffrey Gunter (born 1999), American football player
 Koray Günter (born 1994), German football player
 Maximilian Günther (born 1997), German racing driver
 Per Günther (born 1988), German basketball player
 Ron Guenther (born 1945), American athletic director

In other fields
 Henry Gunther (1895–1918), American soldier, the last Allied soldier killed during World War I
 Joe Gunther, fictional character in novels by Archer Mayor
 Bernie Günther, fictional detective in novels by Philip Kerr

German-language surnames
Patronymic surnames
Surnames from given names